The European integration office of the Republic of Serbia was a coordination body of the Government of Serbia.

It was constituted on 14 March 2004 and dissolved on 29 June 2017 when the Ministry of European Integration of Serbia was formed.

Organization and jurisdiction
The director in charge of the Office, had been appointed by the Government of Serbia on mandate of five years.

The jurisdiction of the Office was established by its statute:
 Strategy for association with and accession to the European Union;
 Monitoring and participating in preparations and negotiations for conclusion of the Stabilisation and Association Agreement with the European Union, implementation of the Stabilisation and Association Agreement and European Union accession;
 Strategy, stimulating and screening the harmonization of regulations of the Republic of Serbia with the European Union regulations and standards, as well as information of the European Union and the public thereupon;
 Coordination of translation of the European Union priority regulations into Serbian and coordination of translation of Serbian legislation into English language;
 Assistance to ministries and special organizations in the process of legal harmonisation with the European Union regulations;
 Monitoring the realization of obligations of ministries and special organizations in the process of European Union association and accession;
 Harmonisation of Serbian institutional capacities and education of civil servants according to the requirements of the European Union association and accession;
 Cooperation with specialized legal institutions;
 Analysis of economic aspects of harmonisation with the European Union regulations and standards;
 Participating in coordination of the programming of European Union’s technical assistance;
 Promoting the EU association and accession activities and cooperation with specialized international and domestic economic institutions;
 Partaking in coordination of activities for planning and use of European funds, donations and other forms of foreign development aid
 SEIO prepares for adoption the acts of the Government designed for supervising, directing and harmonizing the activities of ministries and special organizations in relation to the European Union association and accession and formulates public information on the process of European Union accession and association and other activities delegated by the Government.

References

Government agencies of Serbia